Myrmecioptychium is an extinct lychniscosidan hexasterophoran sea sponge, which is a subgenus of Coeloptychium. Its remains have been found in Santonian-Maastrichtian-aged deposits in Broitzem, Germany and Poland. The type species, M. bodei, was named in 1912.

References 

Fossil taxa described in 1912
Hexactinellida
Prehistoric sponges
Animal subgenera